Ted Studebaker (September 1945 outside of Dayton, Ohio – 26 April 1971) was a pacifist and conscientious objector who served as an agricultural worker during the Vietnam War and was executed by North Vietnam in 1971.

Studebaker was the 7th child of eight born on a farm in the small town of West Milton, Ohio. He was a devout member of the Church of the Brethren, and also excelled in sports and played football in high school as well as in college where he attended the small liberal arts school Manchester University in North Manchester, Indiana. He then attended Florida State University for two years pursuing his graduate degree in social work before he left for Vietnam. He also had a great love for music and was a guitarist.

On August 27, 1967, Studebaker delivered a message from the pulpit to the congregation at the West Milton Church of the Brethren. He expressed concerns about social issues of the day, including the war in Southeast Asia.

"The dehumanizing process of war concerns me deeply," Studebaker said. "What can I do about man's inhumanity to man?"

While in Vietnam he volunteered with the Vietnam Christian service where his goal was to follow the example of Jesus Christ. He volunteered for two years working with a Montagnard hill tribe where he helped them with agricultural production. He bought fertilizer and sold it to the tribe at cost to yield a better crop, did the same with a roto-tiller, and also worked on a poultry production project. He believed that working with the people of Vietnam was the only way to pursue true peace and stability in Vietnam rather than war, although he did not side with either the Vietnamese or the US military. He married a Chinese volunteer named Ven Pak in April 1971 although they were only wed for one week before he was killed.

He was killed on April 26, 1971, by North Vietnamese when they first attacked the volunteers’ house with rockets and then invaded. The soldiers did not know who Studebaker was, they merely saw him as an American and therefore a threat and so he was executed. The lives of his wife and other volunteers were spared.

A record album was released of Ted Studebaker's music. The name of the album is Life is Good, Yea!/Ted Studebaker in Vietnam. According to the liner notes, "This record was produced from cassette tape recordings Ted Stedebaker sent from Vietnam to his family, relatives and friends....This project was conceived by Ted's brother, Gary, and Steve Engle." An original copy of the LP is in the Vietnam War Song Project collection.

References

External links
 Pioneer for Peace: Ted Studebaker
 PEACE HEROES: The Ted Studebaker Story

1945 births
1971 deaths
American conscientious objectors
Manchester University (Indiana) alumni
People from West Milton, Ohio
Florida State University alumni
Activists from Ohio
American members of the Church of the Brethren
Vietnam War casualties